RTG may refer to:

 RTG (trainset) (Rame à Turbine à Gaz), a French gas turbine trainset
 RTG Turboliner, US import of the French trainset
 Radeon Technologies Group, a division of AMD
 Radio Télévision Guinéenne, Guinea
 Radioisotope thermoelectric generator
 Regular tree grammar, a formal grammar
 Renal threshold of glucose, level at which glucose is excreted in urine
 Retargetable graphics, AmigaOS API
 Royal Thai Government
 Rubber tyred gantry crane 
 Frans Sales Lega Airport IATA code